Bitare (Njwande, Yukutare) is a Tivoid language of Nigeria and Cameroon.

References

Languages of Nigeria
Languages of Cameroon
Tivoid languages